Hipponix ticaonicus is a species of small limpet-like sea snail, a marine gastropod mollusc in the family Hipponicidae, the hoof snails.

Description

Distribution

References

External links

Hipponicidae
Gastropods described in 1846